The Cazaderos Formation is an Albian geologic formation in southern Ecuador.

Fossil content 

See also 
 List of fossiliferous stratigraphic units in Ecuador
 List of dinosaur-bearing rock formations
 List of stratigraphic units with theropod tracks
 Hiló Formation, contemporaneous fossiliferous formation of Colombia
 Itapecuru Formation, contemporaneous fossiliferous formation of the São Luis and Parnaíba Basins, Brazil
 Romualdo Formation, contemporaneous fossiliferous formation of the Araripe Basin, Brazil
 Lagarcito Formation, contemporaneous fossiliferous formation of the Marayes-El Carrizal Basin, Argentina
 Lohan Cura Formation, contemporaneous fossiliferous formation of the Neuquén Basin, Argentina
 Cerro Barcino Formation, contemporaneous fossiliferous formation of the Cañadón Asfalto Basin, Argentina
 Mata Amarilla Formation, contemporaneous fossiliferous formation of the Austral Basin, Argentina

References

Bibliography 
 
 

Geologic formations of Ecuador
Lower Cretaceous Series of South America
Cretaceous Ecuador
Albian Stage
Sandstone formations
Fluvial deposits
Ichnofossiliferous formations
Fossiliferous stratigraphic units of South America
Paleontology in Ecuador
Formations